WQAH-FM (105.7 FM, "Big Country 105.7 FM WQAH") is a classic country music, bluegrass, and gospel music-formatted radio station licensed to Addison, Alabama, that serves Decatur, Alabama, and the western portion of the Huntsville, Alabama, market. The station is owned by Abercrombie Broadcasting Company.  WQAH's transmitter is located west of Battleground, Alabama.

The station has held the current WQAH-FM call letters as assigned by the Federal Communications Commission since September 7, 2001. Before this it was known by the WYAM-FM call sign from October 25, 1996, to August 31, 2001. During the six-day gap between these call signs this station was simply WQAH until a co-owned AM station was flipped from WJRA to WQAH on September 7, 2001.

Personalities
Local personalities on WQAH-FM include Mark Donovan, J.T., and the retired Carol Lynn, recipient of the 2006 Alabama Country and Gospel Music Association Award for Radio Personality of the Year. Currently, Hannah Campbell, recipient of the 2020 Alabama Broadcasters Association Best in Broadcasting Small Market Reporter Award and the 2020 Alabama Broadcasters Association Best in Broadcasting Small Market Public Affairs Award, serves as an on-air personality and delivers public service announcements and traffic reports.

References

External links
WQAH-FM official website
WQAH-FM Country Classics Recognition

QAH-FM
Country radio stations in the United States
Winston County, Alabama
Radio stations established in 1996
1996 establishments in Alabama